The 1940 Croatian local elections were held in 625 municipalities of the Banovina of Croatia on 19 May 1940, and in 33 municipalities on 26 May and 2 June. These were the first elections following the Cvetković–Maček Agreement and the establishment of the autonomous Croatian Banate within the Kingdom of Yugoslavia. The elections were not held in cities and some Adriatic counties bordering, or adjacent to, Italy. Only men older than 24 were allowed to vote. Voting was public and conducted by voice.

The elections were a landslide victory for the Croatian Peasant Party (HSS) and the Independent Democratic Party (SDS), the ruling parties of the Banovina of Croatia, which together won a majority in 90% of municipalities. Serb independent lists, supported by organizations opposing the Cvetković–Maček Agreement, won around 5% of municipalities. The Yugoslav Radical Union (JRZ), the ruling party of the Kingdom of Yugoslavia, suffered a heavy defeat and lost control in 80% of its previously held municipalities.

Due to the outbreak of World War II, the 1941 invasion of Yugoslavia, and the subsequent period of communist rule, these were to be the last multi-party elections in Croatia until the 1990 parliamentary election, almost exactly fifty years later.

Background

On 26 August 1939, the autonomous Banovina of Croatia was established within the Kingdom of Yugoslavia. It was formed under the Cvetković–Maček Agreement, signed by Dragiša Cvetković, in the name of the Yugoslav Government, and Vladko Maček, the leader of the Croatian Peasant Party (HSS). The Banovina of Croatia included the entire Sava Banovina and Littoral Banovina, as well as parts of the Drina, Zeta, and Danube Banovinas. Its capital was Zagreb and Ivan Šubašić of the HSS was appointed as Ban of Croatia.

After the HSS achieved its main goal, Croatian autonomy in Yugoslavia, it had to face many new and difficult challenges in taking political responsibility in Croatia and addressing the hopes and expectations of the electorate. Due to the outbreak of the World War II, political leaders in Yugoslavia wanted to appease Germany and align the country with the Third Reich, tying their exports in vital war materials (aluminium, grain etc.) to Germany. Dire economic situation that resulted from the war heavily struck the impoverished peasants and workers in Croatia, still recovering from the Great Depression of the 1930s. The price of food in Croatia rose by between 50% (beef) and 100% (flour, potatoes, beans) between August 1939 and the summer of 1940. Gaping social inequality and the disappointment with the lack of profound political and social change that many expected to occur after Croatia gained its autonomy soon resulted in the rise of support for the Communists and right-wing extremists. Protests and demonstrations against the rising living costs, food and fuel shortages, high unemployment and inequality, as well as the approaching of the war, became ever more often. HSS authorities responded by persecuting trade unions, communists, underground Ustashe, as well as Yugoslav and Serb nationalists, increasingly relying on its paramilitary, Zaštita. During a communist protest in Split on December 17, 1939, the police fired at the crowd, injuring many and killing young shipyard worker and communist party member, football player Vicko Buljanović. His funeral the next day drew a crowd of 25,000 while 12,000 participated in a mass strike in Split and the surrounding region.

After terrorist attacks that included planting explosives in public locations in Zagreb, in February 1940 the Croatian Government banned the fascist Ustashe periodicals (among which Hrvatski narod) and interned 50 Ustashe members in Lepoglava prison, among whom was Mile Budak. Maček viewed the Greater Serbian organizations, the Communists, and the Frankists (Frankovci), a name he used for far-right extremists, as a danger to the existence of the common state. For him, the Communists were a "fifth column" of the Soviet Union, and he described the actions of the Frankists as "directed by Pavelić's emigrants from Italy". The Croatian Government also used the Lepoglava prison for the imprisonment of Communists, and the newly built Kruščica camp near Travnik as a detention site for the Frankists.

Under the Cvetković–Maček Agreement that established the Croatian autonomy, it was envisaged that the Croatian Parliament (Hrvatski Sabor) would be elected. Since August 1939, in absence of a Croatian legislature, Ban Šubašić governed through decrees and executive orders. Finally, on January 14, Regent Paul visited Croatia's capital, Zagreb, and co-signed the electoral law for Sabor elections. In preparation of these elections to elect the first Croatian legislature since Sabor of Kingdom of Croatia-Slavonia was elected in 1913, the local elections in municipalities were about to take place. The last local elections of 1936 and the most recent parliamentary elections of 1938, despite being marred by regime violence, police obstruction and occasional casualties, showed strong support for the HSS-led opposition to the ruling parties and the King of Yugoslavia.

In April, Ban Ivan Šubašić issued an executive order detailing the rules for the local elections. The list that gains relative majority was to be assigned a third of the seats in the council, while the remaining two thirds were to be divided among the lists relative to their votes under the proportional d'Hondt method. Under the old rules, the party with relative majority was immediately assigned two-thirds of the seats. The council president (mayor) was to be elected on a secret ballot in the council, but does not necessarily have to be a councilman. Municipal clerks (notaries, treasuries) became Banovina's employees, not local ones. Ban of Croatia also had the right to regroup the municipalities, dissolve them, and change their borders. Šubašić used this right to regroup municipalities in Posavina, in Derventa, Brčko and Gradačac districts.

On April 22, Šubašić called the elections for May 19. Due to the WWII engulfing most of Europe and the Royal Yugoslav Army being placed at the higher level of alertness, many men were called to serve with the reserve troops or to take part in the army maneuvers. HSS decided not to call the elections in cities, but just municipalities. In cities, HSS-led Croatian government appointed HSS members as mayors or commissioners. In April, after the increased Serb nationalist activities refuting the Cvetković-Maček agreement, the government also dissolved the municipalities in Serb-majority Kistanje and Obrovac. Smilčić and Skradin municipalities were also dissolved.

On May 10, German army attacked the Low Countries and France, intensifying the war. Netherlands surrendered on 15 May. By 17 May, Germans occupied Brussels and overran most of Belgium, reaching the French channel. These events had a deep impact on public opinion in Yugoslavia.

Women's vote
Yugoslav magazine Žena danas ("Woman Today") started campaigning in October 1939 to extend the suffrage to women. Socialist trade unions and communists in Croatia supported the action. However, the women's organisation of HSS opposed it, declaring that the party leadership will decide when the best moment to introduce women's suffrage in Croatia is.

Campaign

Ban Šubašić visited less developed regions in Lika and Dalmatia in late 1939, promising public works on infrastructure. Secretary-general of the Croatian Peasant Party, Juraj Krnjević, toured Croatia, visiting municipal and district party organizations, trying to settle some disputes, unite fractions and revert splits in the party. For instance, the differences in opinion on certain appointments and on the issue of supporting the metal workers' strike in Slavonski Brod alienated the district party organisation from the national HSS leadership; as Brod HSS refused to toe the party line and split into many factions, the entire district organisation was dissolved in March 1940, despite the 37-6 vote of confidence in the Brod party chairman. In general, Krnjević tried to assuage dissidents and remind the party cadre of the importance of the elections. While he had some success in Dubrovnik, still, according to historian G. Jakovčev, there were as many as 70 lists by HSS dissidents in Dalmatia alone (e.g. Ston, Šipan, Makarska, etc.). Krnjević also tried to address the economic concerns, declaring at a rally in Split that Croatia has to be more equal and that HSS will not allow some to be millionaires while others are hungry. Maček tried to downplay the importance of the elections, going as far as saying that he does not attach "any political importance" to it, as many local and even personal particularities play a role in them. In a circular note to HSS organisations he reminded them to consider economic interests first when choosing candidates for councilmen and mayors. However, it was still important to eliminate anti-agreement forces (JRZ in particular) from positions of power in Croatia and show HSS and SDS' strength.

Due to the royal Yugoslav regime's ban and persecution since 1921, Croatian communists had to run in the elections as the Party of the working people (Croatian Stranka radnog naroda, SRN). According to historian Sibe Kvesić, the gendarmerie and the local authorities frequently harassed the communists and their supporters, spreading rumours and threatening voters who intended to vote for the communists. In some places, the judicial or administrative authorities pressed hard to bar the SRN putting the candidates due to any petty mistakes.

Political opponents of Cvetković-Maček agreement and the establishment of Banovina of Croatia had different strategies for contesting the elections. Yugoslav people's party (JNS) in Croatia, chaired by Grga Andjelinović, chose not to contest the elections, while it advised party cadre and fractions under senator Petar Zec to still put up lists in some municipalities together with the Yugoslav radicals (JRZ) and other Serb parties. These were usually named "nonpartisan Serb lists." Serb nationalists claimed that the Banovina of Croatia was Maček's dictatorship and that only a unitary and centralised Kingdom of Yugoslavia could bring prosperity to Croatian Serbs. Some of them openly advocated secession of Serb-majority municipalities and counties from Banovina of Croatia and joining neighbouring, Serb-majority Vrbas Banovina. JRZ chairman, Yugoslav prime minister Cvetković, called Serbs of Croatia to cast their votes for JRZ as a show of support for unitary Yugoslavia.

On May 1, Croatian communists organised a mass strike in Zagreb to commemorate the International Workers' Day, claiming strike participation rate close to 90%. Communist activists and protests, predominantly students, blocked the tram depot and thus prevented the trams in Zagreb from operating the entire day. Tram workers' trade union joined them as well. Protesting workers clashed with the police and HSS paramilitary (Zaštita), resulting in numerous wounded and injured. This was the first time in Kingdom of Yugoslavia the workers decided to organize mass strikes and protests on May 1.

On May 17, just two days ahead of the elections, Ban Šubašić postponed indefinitely the elections in municipalities in Kastav, Čabar, Delnice, Sušak, Benkovac and Šibenik district. The Croatian government officially stated that it exempted them due to their proximity to the Adriatic military area surrounding important naval harbors. Namely, this operational zone was put under alert after the begin of the WWII due to its bordering Italy or being adjacent to Italian coast, as Yugoslavia was wary of an Italian attack. However, others suspected that the elections were not held there due to some of these municipalities being communist strongholds (such as Tisno, Zlarin and Vodice, where communists won in 1936) as an expected communist victory there would make HSS weaknesses very visible. At the same time, Ban Šubašić postponed the elections in Brčko and Gradačac district and Konavle municipality for May 26, and in Derventa district as well as Pazarište, Brestovsko, Kloštar Ivanić, Bosiljevo, Šamac and Cvetlin municipalities for 2 June.

Voting
Only men older than 24 were allowed to vote. Voting was public; a voter had to loudly declare his name and the list he wanted to vote for. In many municipalities, the only list contesting the elections was the HSS one. In some municipalities (Andrijaševci, Retkovci, Opuzen, Gunja and Farkaševac), clashes between the voters and incidents occurred so the elections had to be repeated or postponed for a week. Elections were held in 620 municipalities on May 19, while some counties voted a week later or in June. After Šubašić's reshuffling prior to the local elections, the Banovina of Croatia had altogether 693 municipalities and 25 cities within 99 districts at the end of 1940. Two of those municipalities were created after the local elections were held.

Due to gerrymandering of municipal borders just before the elections, most notably in attaching JRZ-leaning Cavtat to HSS-leaning Gruda to form a new municipality (Konavle) south of Dubrovnik or Independent Democratic Party (SDS)-advocated border changes in Bosanska Posavina around Odžak, some Bosniaks and Serbs boycotted the elections there.

Election results
The HSS-SDS coalition won a majority of municipalities and established full political control over the territory of the Banovina of Croatia. Preliminary results of the 19 May elections showed that the HSS alone won a majority in 425 municipalities, the SDK in 106, the SDS in 27, the HSS and the Muslim Organization of the HSS in 4, the HSS and Germans in 1, the Muslim Organization of the HSS in 2, the SDK with other groups in 1, and the SDS with other Serb parties in 1. The JRZ won a majority in 20 municipalities, the JRZ and Farmers in 1, joint Serb lists in 8, Serb non-partisan lists in 18, non-partisan city lists in 2, independent lists in 2, Farmers in 1, leftists in 1, Germans in 3, and ethnic minority lists in 2.

The election showed some weakening of support for the major political parties. After the local elections in 1936, HSS won majority in 512 out of 612 municipalities in Sava and Littoral banovina, roughly corresponding with the later-established Banovina of Croatia. In littoral banovina, in 1936 HSS won 75 out of 94 municipalities (80%).

The results were especially poor showing for Yugoslav radical union (JRZ), which won majority in 21 municipalities, compared to 108 they held power in before the elections. In 195 municipalities with absolute or relative Serb majority, out of 121,429 voters JRZ and independent Serb lists won 36,502 votes, SDS alone 15,183 while HSS-SDS coalition (SDK) won 44.262 votes. The JRZ lost most of its previously held municipalities to the SDK and the SDS.

The Communists won the majority in the councils of Sinj, Trogir, Komiža, and Vrboska (2/3 majority), a third of votes in Omiš, and a quarter in Makarska in Dalmatia. In Vrgorac, communists came second and won 8 seats in the council, while in Smiljan they lost by 4 votes in repeated elections, also winning 8 seats in the council.

Independent German ethnic lists won majority in 5 municipalities. Ethnic Germans ran on other lists, too, mostly on HSS tickets. Joint HSS-German list won in one municipality. Altogether, ethnic Croatian Germans won 177 mandates in 45 municipalities.

Elections in 20 municipalities were held on 26 May, and in 13 municipalities on 2 June. On 5 June, the Government published the corrected results for some municipalities.

Turnout
As the 1936 local elections were used by the HSS-led Croatian opposition to wrestle some self-government from the central Yugoslav authorities, the turnout stood at around 80%. The turnout in 1940 was significantly lower in many areas, partially reflecting the dissatisfaction and the lack of interest of the population. In Osijek district as a whole, the turnout was 50.89% (4,708 voted out of 9,250), in Drniš it was 52.11%, while In Daruvar district the turnout was 48% (4,076 voted). At some parts of Daruvar area it was as low as 21%. As the communists were administratively barred from contesting the elections in Vis, many chose to abstain in protest, bringing the turnout to 50%. On the other hand, Royal Yugoslav Armed forces mobilized many men fit for military service in its 1939/40 mobilization.

Summary

Mandates (19 May)

Overal municipalities

Municipalities

Aftermath 
Elected municipal council members met after the elections to constitute the council and elect the municipality mayor among themselves. Communist council members in Trogir and Vis refused to take an oath of loyalty to the king and consequently had their mandates made void. According to Jakovčev, 60 municipalities in Dalmatia alone protested due to forgeries and irregularities. In Vrboska, one of the few municipalities that were won by communists, elections were declared void by the government and then repeated on July 28. Busing in voters from Dol and elsewhere and intimidating the communists, HSS managed to secure the majority. Workers' list with Pero Nagulic on the ticket lost to the HSS list headed by Mihovil Stojsic.

In Knin, where the Serb nationalist non-partisan list under dr. Niko Novaković got 27 out of 36 councilmen, Croatian government dissolved the Knin town council and appointed secretary of the local HSS, Vice Musić, as the mayor.

In Bobota, all municipal councilmen elected on non-partisan Serb list decided to join SDS, disappointed by the election results in eastern Slavonia.

Maček declared the elections as a "90% victory for the pro-agreement parties", emphasizing that "the SDS won the majority among Croatian Serbs". He touted the results as a "lesson" for anti-agreement parties. Shortly after the elections, having in mind the incidents that occurred, ban Šubašić indefinitely banned all public gatherings, rallies or protests except for religious events.

Footnotes

References
Books and journals

 
 
 
 
 
 
 
 
 
 

News articles

Literature
Konjević, Mile (1973). "Općinski izbori u Banovini Hrvatskoj 19. maja 1940. godine", Prilozi Instituta za istoriju Sarajevo 9(1)

Boban, Ljubo. "Previranja na selu u Banovini Hrvatskoj", Istorija XX veka, II., Beograd, 1961.
Kolar-Dimitrijević, Mira (1976). "Utjecaj fašizma na ekonomsko-socijalnu politiku Hrvatske do travnja 1941. godine", Zbornik fašizam i neofašizam, CDD, Zagreb, 221.-233. 
Jelić-Butić, Fikreta. Prilog proučavanju djelatnosti ustaša do 1941. godine
IŠEK, Tomislav (1991.). Hrvatska seljačka stranka u Bosni i Hercegovini 1929. -1941., Sarajevo: Institut za istoriju, 1991.
Boban, Ljubo (1974) Maček i politika HSS-a od 1928. do 1941., Zagreb, Liber, knjiga I. II.

1940 elections in Europe
1940 in Croatia
1940
May 1940 events